Johnny Clayton Taylor Jr. is an American lawyer, author, board member and public speaker who is the president and Chief Executive Officer of the Society for Human Resource Management (SHRM). He was previously president and CEO of the Thurgood Marshall College Fund (TMCF), which represents the 47 publicly-supported historically Black colleges and universities in the United States. In February 2018, President Donald Trump appointed Taylor Chair of the President's Advisory Board on Historically Black Colleges and Universities. He is Vice Chair of the University of Miami, and Trustee of Jobs for America’s Graduates.  Taylor currently sits on the corporate boards of Guild Education, Internet Collaborative Information Management Systems (ICIMS), and XPO Logistics.

In 2021, Taylor was named GlobalMindEd’s Inclusive leader of the year and CEO Update’s Professional CEO of the Year. In August 2022, Taylor was recognized and celebrated for his gifts and contributions to the University of Miami at the 2-day Johnny C. Taylor, Jr. Breezeway dedication event, which celebrates the legacy, history, and future of the Black experience at the University of Miami. Taylor is licensed to practice law in Florida, Illinois, and Washington, D.C.

Early life and education 
Taylor was born and raised in Fort Lauderdale, Florida and graduated as valedictorian of his class at Dillard High School in Broward County. He attended the University of Miami, where he was an Isaac Bashevis Singer Scholar and graduated with honors with a Bachelor of Science in Communication. He went on to earn a Master of Arts with honors from Drake University and a Juris Doctor with honors from the Drake Law School, where he served as research editor of the Drake Law Review and argued on the National Moot Court Team He is licensed to practice law in Florida, Illinois, and Washington, D.C. Bar Associations.

Career 
On June 1, 2017, the Society for Human Resource Management (SHRM) named Taylor president and Chief Executive Officer. SHRM represents a global network of over 300,000 human resources professionals, business executives, and people managers, and has offices in the United States, United Arab Emirates, and India.  While serving as CEO, Taylor repositioned the SHRM Foundation, a 501(c)(3) subsidiary of SHRM, into an active charity with a broader remit and donor base increasing the SHRM Foundation endowment fund by $10 million. Taylor re-branded SHRM for not only HR certification, but for all things work, worker, and workplace.

Prior to serving as CEO of SHRM, Taylor was selected to lead the Thurgood Marshall College Fund (TMCF) in 2010. This includes 47 publicly-supported Historically Black Colleges and Universities, 6 Law Schools, and 2 Medical Schools, and over 300,000 students. During his tenure as President of TMCF, Taylor secured several notable partnerships. In March 2015, Apple Inc. committed $50 million to diversity efforts, $40 million of which created programming, scholarships and other initiatives for the faculty and students of historically Black colleges and universities (HBCU). In January 2017, the Charles Koch Foundation and Koch Industries announced a $25.6 million gift to TMCF to create the Center for Advancing Opportunity (CAO), which created research centers on HBCU campuses that administer scholarship and fellowships and focus on issues facing marginalized communities in the areas of education, criminal justice reform, and entrepreneurship. The CAO partnered with Gallup to create an index to measure sentiment in communities facing these issues.

Preceding his presidency of TMCF, Taylor worked for InterActiveCorp (IAC), a media company, first as the senior vice president of human resources, and then as the president and chief executive officer of one of IAC's operating subsidiaries RushmoreDrive, the first search engine created for the Black community.

Law career 
Before joining IAC, Taylor was a partner and Chief Executive in the McGuireWoods law firm, focusing on consulting services for human resource issues. Prior to joining McGuireWoods, Taylor served as Chief Legal Officer and Corporate Secretary to Compass Group USA. He’s held several senior human resources and legal executive roles with Viacom and its subsidiaries including Blockbuster Entertainment, Paramount Pictures, and Alamo Rent a Car.

Author 
Taylor has published several notable works, most recently national best seller RESET: A Leader’s Guide to Work in an Age of Upheaval.

He is also co-author of The Trouble with HR: An Insider's Guide to Finding and Keeping the Best People, which studies employee relations, compensation and benefits, training, on-boarding, and development practices. He authors a weekly column in USA Today titled "Ask HR."

Public speaking 
Taylor speaks on business leadership, diversity, management, politics at work, and human resources. He has spoken to The Today Show, CNBC, Reuters, HR Magazine, CBS Evening News, TIME, Fortune, and The Wall Street Journal, and Big Think.  In addition, Taylor has testified before Congress on several occasions. His testimonies covered workforce issues such as sexual harassment and paid leave.

In 2017, Taylor gave the keynote address at Albany State University’s fall commencement ceremony for graduates of College of Arts and Humanities, the College of Education, and the College of Sciences and Technology. He previously delivered the keynote address at SHRM affiliate conferences, including The Chesapeake Bay (CHRA) Fall Conference, the Tri-County HR Conference & Expo, and New York City SHRM. In 2019, he spoke at the International Career and Business Alliance Diversity and Inclusion conference.

He is a member of the All American Entertainment Speakers Bureau (AAE). In 2022, Taylor gives a speech for Miami class of 2022 ceremonies at the Watsco Center.

Board Positions 
Taylor currently sits on the corporate boards of Guild Education, iCIMS, and XPO Logistics. He also serves on several non-profit boards including the Board of Trustees at the University of Miami, and the Board of Trustees for Jobs for America’s Graduates. 

Taylor has previously served on the boards of Gallup Inc., AuBon Pain, Inc., The Cooper Union, Society for Human Resource Management/SHRM, Drake University, BlumenthalPerforming Arts Center, Leader to Leader Institute f/k/a The Peter F. Drucker Foundation, YMCA of the USA, and Johnson C. Smith University. He was also an advisor to Safe Streets and Second Chances, a program working to reduce recidivism among previously incarcerated individuals.

Taylor has served in several government appointed positions. He acted as chair to President Trump’s Advisory Board on Historically Black Colleges and Universities and served on the White House American Workforce Policy Advisory Board.  The Board advises the National Council for the American Worker on how to ensure that American students and workers have access to the resources they need to succeed in the global economy. In 2020, Taylor was U.S. Representative Mark Walker’s guest for the State of the Union address.

Articles 

 Johnny C. Taylor Jr. (May 3, 2022) "How do I support employees' caregiving needs?" USA TODAY 
 Johnny C. Taylor Jr. (April 29, 2022) "Ask HR: What's the Best Way to Ask for Raise?" MUCK RACK 
 Johnny C. Taylor Jr. (April 29, 2022) "Ask HR: what to Do When You Have Second Thoughts Abouts a New Job" SHRM 
 Johnny C. Taylor Jr. (March 26, 2019) "Can worker get written up for changing TV to Fox News? Free-speech rights differ in office" Herald 
 Johnny C. Taylor Jr. (August 31, 2021) "How the Pandemic Changed Talent Management (Back to Work, Better)" Harvards Business review 
 Johnny C. Taylor Jr. "Flexibility in the Workplace Is No Longer an Anomaly"  Fbusiness and tech 
 Johnny C. Taylor Jr. (September 26, 2021) "THE POWER OF PEOPLE YOU OVERLOOK" Wiley Library

Personal life 
Taylor married former WNBA player Charlotte Smith-Taylor in 2002. The couple divorced in 2007. Taylor has two children, Taylor and Raleigh, and resides in the Washington D.C. metropolitan area. He also manages the family's holding company, Taylor Holdings of Broward Inc.

Awards 
In 2011, Taylor was named one of Ebony magazine's "Power 100" list of influential African-Americans. In March *2019, Drake University awarded Taylor their alumni of the year award.
In 2020, Taylor was named one of LinkedIn's best in class for government, advocacy, and non-profits. The same year he was named a top ten human resources influencer by the LaSalle Network and a King Legacy award recipient at the 29th International Salute to the Life and Legacy of Dr. Martin Luther King Jr. breakfast.
In 2021, Taylor was named Professional Society CEO of the Year by CEO Update.
Taylor was Named a 2022 LinkedIn Top Voice in Company culture

References

African-American lawyers
African-American writers
American male writers
Living people
University of Miami School of Communication alumni
Year of birth missing (living people)
21st-century African-American people
African-American male writers
Drake University Law School alumni